The following are lists of curling clubs in Canada. According to Curling Canada, there are nearly 1000 curling clubs in the country.

 List of curling clubs in Alberta
 List of curling clubs in British Columbia
 List of curling clubs in Manitoba
 List of curling clubs in New Brunswick
 List of curling clubs in Newfoundland and Labrador
 List of curling clubs in Nova Scotia
 List of curling clubs in Ontario
 List of curling clubs in Prince Edward Island
 List of curling clubs in Quebec
 List of curling clubs in Saskatchewan
 List of curling clubs in Yukon, the Northwest Territories and Nunavut

A 

 Assiniboine Memorial Curling Club

B 

 Bally Haly Golf & Curling Club
 Brandon Curling Club
 Brantford Golf & Country Club
 Buckingham Curling Club
 Burlington Curling Club

C 

 Caledonian Curling Club
 Calgary Curling Club
 Caroline Curling Club
 Cataraqui Golf and Country Club
 Charleswood Curling Club
 Chatham Granite Club
 Cornwall Curling Club
 Crestwood Curling Club

E 

 East St. Paul Curling Club

F 

 Fort Rouge Curling Club
 Fort William Curling Club

G 

 Garrison Golf and Curling Club
 Granite Curling Club (Winnipeg)

H 

 High Park Club
 Halifax Curling Club

K 

 Kelowna Curling Club
 KW Granite Club

L 

 Leaside Curling Club
 Lethbridge Curling Club

M 

 Mayflower Curling Club
 Mississaugua Golf & Country Club

N 

 Nanaimo Curling Club
 Nutana Curling Club

O 

 Ottawa Curling Club
 Ottawa Hunt and Golf Club

Q 

 Quinte Curling Club

R 

 RA Centre
 Red Deer Curling Club
 Richmond Curling Centre
 Richmond Hill Curling Club
 Rideau Curling Club
 Royal Canadian Curling Club
 Royal City Curling Club
 The Royal Glenora Club
 Royal Kingston Curling Club
 Royal Montreal Curling Club

S 

 Saville Community Sports Centre
 Scarboro Golf and Country Club
 Soo Curlers Association
 St. George's Golf and Country Club
 St. John's Curling Club
 St. Vital Curling Club
 Steinbach Curling Club
 Sutherland Curling Club

T 

 The Glencoe Club
 The Granite Club
 Toronto Cricket, Skating and Curling Club

U 

 Unionville Curling Club

V 

 Victoria Curling Club

W 

 Westmount Golf and Country Club
 Weston Golf and Country Club

Y 

 Yellowknife Curling Centre

References 

C